Adenbüttel is a municipality in the Gifhorn district in Lower Saxony, Germany. It is a member municipality of the Samtgemeinde Papenteich. The Municipality Adenbüttel includes the villages of Adenbüttel and Rolfsbüttel

Geography

Neighbourhood 
* distance from downtown

Geographical position 
Adenbüttel is situated north of Braunschweig, between the Harz and the Lüneburg Heath. However, administrative it belongs to the district of Gifhorn. Adenbüttel is around 4 km to the west to the German highway 4 (near Meine) and around 7 km to the north of the interchange Brunswick North (A2 /A391). Other bigger towns nearby are: Wolfsburg, Salzgitter, Wolfenbüttel, Gifhorn, Peine and Celle.

History
The first documentary mentioning of Adenbüttel was in the year 1226. In 1619 a church was erected, whose baseplate can yet be seen nowadays. In the first half of 20th century a potash mine existed near the village.

Politics
The last election for the community government took place on the 10 September 2006 with an election turnout of 73.39%. Since that day the district council consists as follows:

 CDU 5 Seats 
 SPD 4 Seats 
 Independent Party 2 Seats

References

Gifhorn (district)